Ploské is a village and municipality in Košice-okolie District in the Kosice Region of eastern Slovakia.

External links

Villages and municipalities in Košice-okolie District
Šariš